Sweden competed at the 1994 Winter Paralympics in Lillehammer, Norway. 27 competitors from Sweden won 8 medals including 3 gold, 3 silver and 2 bronze and finished 8th in the medal table.

See also 
 Sweden at the Paralympics
 Sweden at the 1994 Winter Olympics

References 

1994
1994 in Swedish sport
Nations at the 1994 Winter Paralympics